Amphidromus cruentatus is a species of air-breathing tree snail, an arboreal gastropod mollusk in the family Camaenidae.

Distribution 
Type locality is Cambodia.

Habitat 
Tree dwellers.

References 

cruentatus
Gastropods described in 1875